Pyractomena punctiventris is a species in the family Lampyridae (fireflies), in the order Coleoptera (beetles).
It is found in North America, where it is known from east-central Texas south to Veracruz, Mexico.

References

Further reading
 American Beetles, Volume II: Polyphaga: Scarabaeoidea through Curculionoidea, Arnett, R.H. Jr., M. C. Thomas, P. E. Skelley and J. H. Frank. (eds.). 2002. CRC Press LLC, Boca Raton, FL.
 American Insects: A Handbook of the Insects of America North of Mexico, Ross H. Arnett. 2000. CRC Press.
 McDermott, F. A. / Steel, W. O., ed. (1966). Lampyridae. Coleopterorum Catalogus Supplementa, pars 9, 149.
 Peterson Field Guides: Beetles, Richard E. White. 1983. Houghton Mifflin Company.

Lampyridae
Bioluminescent insects
Beetles described in 1878